Beatriz Ferreira de Menezes (born 25 June 1997), known as Bia Menezes, is a Brazilian footballer who plays as either a left back or a midfielder for Santos FC.

Club career
Born in São José dos Campos, São Paulo, Bia Ferreira made her senior debut with Centro Olímpico in the 2016 season. In 2018, after a year at Rio Preto, she moved to Flamengo.

In January 2020, Bia Menezes left Fla and joined Santos.

International career
Bia Menezes represented Brazil at under-20 level in the 2015 South American U-20 Women's Championship and the 2016 FIFA U-20 Women's World Cup.

Honours

Club
Santos
Copa Paulista de Futebol Feminino: 2020

International
Brazil U20
South American U-20 Women's Championship: 2015

References

1997 births
Living people
People from São José dos Campos
Brazilian women's footballers
Women's association football defenders
Women's association football midfielders
Campeonato Brasileiro de Futebol Feminino Série A1 players
Associação Desportiva Centro Olímpico players
Santos FC (women) players
Footballers from São Paulo (state)
Clube de Regatas do Flamengo (women) players